Gryponautilus is a genus of Upper Triassic nautilids (generally coiled nautiloid cephalopods) belonging to the trigonoceratacean family Grypoceratidae, characterized by involute, inflated shells, which at maturity develop narrowly rounded keel-like venters. Venters on inner whorls are truncated and broadly convex to concave.

Immature forms bear a resemblance to Grypoceras.

References

Prehistoric nautiloid genera